Thressa Campbell Stadtman (February 12, 1920 – December 11, 2016) was an American biochemist, notable for her discovery of selenocysteine, and her research on selenoproteins and bioenergetics. In addition she made significant advances in amino acid metabolism, enzymes dependent on vitamin B12, and the biochemistry of microbes.

Life

In 1920, she was born in Sterling, New York. In 1940, she graduated from Cornell University, with a B.S. in Microbiology, and in 1942, with a M.S. in Microbiology and Nutrition. In 1949, she graduated from University of California, Berkeley, with a Ph.D. in Microbial Biochemistry. Her thesis was titled "Studies on Methane Fermentations", and subsequently worked as a postdoc for Christian B. Anfinsen.

She was married to Earl Reece Stadtman whom she met when they were both graduate students at the University of California, Berkeley. They were both hired by what was then the National Heart Institute in 1950 becoming the first husband-and-wife team at the National Institutes of Health. They both oversaw their own biochemistry labs and collaborated closely. In 2005, they were both honored by the NIH with an exhibit titled "The Stadtman Way: A Tale of Two Biochemists at NIH." 

Over a 60-year period, starting in 1943, she published 212 peer-reviewed papers.

Stadtman was elected a member of the National Academy of Sciences in 1981.

Stadtman died in December 2016 at the age of 96.

References

External links
 Interview of Thressa C. Stadtman by Buhm Soon Park, January 2001
 Vadim N. Gladyshev, P. Boon Chock, and Rodney L. Levine, "Thressa C. Stadtman", Biographical Memoirs of the National Academy of Sciences (2020)

1920 births
2016 deaths
Cornell University alumni
Members of the United States National Academy of Sciences
University of California, Berkeley alumni
American women biochemists
21st-century American women